Toetie Selbach (born 11 April 1934) is a Dutch gymnast. She competed in seven events at the 1952 Summer Olympics. Her older sister Tootje Selbach also competed at the 1952 Summer Olympics in Helsinki.

References

External links
 

1934 births
Living people
Dutch female artistic gymnasts
Olympic gymnasts of the Netherlands
Gymnasts at the 1952 Summer Olympics
Gymnasts from Amsterdam